The 1975 Copa América Final was the final match to determine the Copa América champion. The first leg was held in Estadio El Campín of Bogotá on October 16, the second leg in Estadio Nacional of Lima on October 22, and the playoff match in Estadio Olímpico of Caracas on 28 October.

The final was played in a two-legged tie system, the team earning more points would be the champion. A tie on points was resolved in a play-off match to be played at a neutral venue. It happened when Peru and Colombia each won a match. Peru would defeat Colombia, 1–0. It was their second title. Hugo Sotil of FC Barcelona scored the goal.

Qualified teams 

Notes

Venues

Route to the final 

Notes
 Peru and Brazil tied 3–3 on aggregate but Peru qualified by the drawing of lots.
 Colombia won 3–1 on aggregate

Match details

First leg

Second leg

Play-off

References

1975 Copa América
1975 in South American football
1975 in Peruvian football
Colombia national football team matches
Peru national football team matches
Sports competitions in Lima
Sports competitions in Bogotá
Sports competitions in Caracas
1970s in Lima
20th century in Bogotá
20th century in Caracas
October 1975 sports events in South America
Copa América finals